Alexander Bryce Linwood (13 March 1920 –  26 October 2003) was a Scottish footballer who played for St Mirren, Middlesbrough, Hibernian, Clyde, Greenock Morton and the Scotland national team.

Career
Born in the tiny mining settlement of Drumsmudden, near Drongan in Ayrshire, Linwood began working in the mines at the age of 14. He played schools and juvenile football before joining the newly formed Muirkirk Juniors in 1938. Linwood signed for St Mirren the same year, however on the outbreak of World War II, the player was forced to resume his mining career for the war effort.

A centre-forward, Linwood continued to play wartime football for St. Mirren and also played in an unofficial international match against England at Maine Road in 1943 which the Scots lost 8–0. In all, Linwood scored 165 goals in 236 competitive matches for St Mirren between 1938–1946 and remains the club's second top goalscorer of all time. He finished as the team's top scorer in all seven seasons with the club.

After Motherwell had a bid rejected in November 1945, Linwood moved to Middlesbrough in 1946 but struggled to make an impact in the English First Division, partly due to still having to work as a miner while his teammates were full-time professionals. The player returned to Hibernian and won the Scottish Football League championship in 1948, his only senior footballing honour.

Later in 1948, Linwood represented the Scottish League XI. In November 1949, now as a Clyde player, Linwood scored in his only cap for Scotland, a 2–0 win over Wales in a British Home Championship match which doubled as a 1950 World Cup qualifier.

While at Shawfield, Linwood played in 1949 Scottish Cup final and scored 30 goals the season after. He was the first post-war Clyde player to net five goals in a match.

He later moved to Morton in 1951 before retiring in 1955. Linwood died on 23 October 2003 at the age of 83.

Honours 

St Mirren
 Summer Cup: 1942–43
 Renfrewshire Cup: 1945–46

Hibernian
 Scottish Division A: 1947–48

Clyde
 Scottish Cup: Runner-up 1948–49

Morton
 Renfrewshire Cup: 1951–52

Career statistics

Notes

References

External links 

Profile at Londonhearts.com

Alec Linwood, www.ihibs.co.uk

1920 births
2003 deaths
Association football forwards
Scottish footballers
Scotland international footballers
Scotland wartime international footballers
St Mirren F.C. players
Middlesbrough F.C. players
Hibernian F.C. players
Clyde F.C. players
Greenock Morton F.C. players
Scottish Football League players
English Football League players
Scottish Football League representative players
Scottish Junior Football Association players
Muirkirk Juniors F.C. players
Partick Thistle F.C. wartime guest players
Footballers from East Ayrshire